Boralday (Boraldai) is a town located some 5 kilometres to the north of Almaty in Almaty Region of south-eastern Kazakhstan. The airport Boraldai Airport is located in the southeast part of the town. It is connected by road to Chemolgan.

An Iron Age kurgan necropolis, also called Boralday, is located on the outskirts of the village.

The climate in Boralday is described as humid continental with a hot summer. The temperature in Boralday is warmest during July.

References

External links 

 Tageo.com

Populated places in Almaty Region